Below are the squads for the 2020 AFF Championship, which took place between 5 December 2021 to 1 January 2022.

The age listed for each player is on 5 December 2021, the first day of the tournament. The club listed is the club for which the player last played a competitive match prior to the tournament. The nationality for each club reflects the national association (not the league) to which the club is affiliated. A flag is included for coaches that are of a different nationality than their own national team.

Group A

Thailand 
Head coach:  Alexandré Pölking

Jonathan Khemdee withdrew due to illness.

Myanmar 
Head coach:  Antoine Hey

Philippines 
Head coach:  Stewart Hall

Singapore 
Head coach:  Tatsuma Yoshida

Timor-Leste 
Head coach:  Fábio Magrão

Group B

Vietnam 
Head coach:  Park Hang-seo

Malaysia 
Head coach: Tan Cheng Hoe

Indonesia
Head coach:  Shin Tae-yong

Cambodia 
Head coach:  Ryu Hirose

Laos 
Head coach:  V. Selvaraj

Statistics

By age

Outfield players
Oldest:  Hassan Sunny
Youngest:  Zenivio

Goalkeepers
Oldest:  Hassan Sunny
Youngest:  Solasak Thilavong

Captains
Oldest:  Stephan Schröck
Youngest:  Armindo de Almeida

Player representation by league system

Player representation by club 
Clubs with 6 or more players represented are listed.

Player representation by club confederation

Coaches representation by country 
Coaches in bold represent their own country.

References

AFF Championship squads
2020 AFF Championship